William Andrew Whitaker (January 18, 1959 – October 2, 2022) was an American football defensive back in the National Football League (NFL) who played for the Green Bay Packers and the St. Louis Cardinals.  Whitaker played collegiate ball for the University of Missouri before being drafted by the Green Bay Packers in the 7th round of the 1981 NFL Draft.  He played professionally in the NFL for 4 seasons and retired in 1984.

Whitaker died on October 2, 2022, at the age of 63.

References

1959 births
2022 deaths
Players of American football from Kansas City, Missouri
American football defensive backs
Missouri Tigers football players
Green Bay Packers players
St. Louis Cardinals (football) players